Delta Piscis Austrini, Latinized from δ Piscis Austrini, is a yellow-hued star in the southern constellation of Piscis Austrinus. It is visible to the naked eye with an apparent visual magnitude of +4.175. There is a magnitude 9.86 common proper motion companion located at an angular separation of 5.2 arc seconds – the pair most likely form a binary star system. Based upon an annual parallax shift of 18.9796 mas as seen from the Gaia satellite, Delta Piscis Austrini is located 172 ± 2 light-years from the Sun.

The primary, component A, is an evolved G-type giant star with a stellar classification of G8 III. At the age of about 3.74 billion years it is a red clump star, which indicates it is generating energy through helium fusion at its core. The star has an estimated 1.42 times the mass of the Sun and it radiates 52 times the solar luminosity from its photosphere at an effective temperature of 4.828 K.

Delta Piscis Austrini is moving through the Galaxy at a speed of 13.8 km/s relative to the Sun.

Chinese name
The Chinese name for Delta Piscis Austrini is  meaning Materials for Making Tents, because this star is marking itself and stand alone in Materials for Making Tents asterism, Encampment mansion (see : Chinese constellation). 天綱 (Tiān Gāng) westernized into Tien Kang, meaning "the Heavenly Rope" in R.H. Allen's work, but the name is for the asterism consisting this star, β PsA and ζ PsA.

References

G-type giants
Horizontal-branch stars
Binary stars

Piscis Austrinus
Piscis Austrini, Delta
Durchmusterung objects
Piscis Austrini, 23
216763
113246
8720